Macomia District is a district of Cabo Delgado Province in northern Mozambique. It covers 4,252 km² with 91,033 inhabitants.

External links
Government profile 

Districts in Cabo Delgado Province